Buffyverse novels include Buffy novels, Angel novels, Buffy/Angel novels and Tales of the Slayer.

Chronology

History

Buffy Season 1

These Buffyverse tales take place around Buffy Season 1 (from spring 1996 up until spring 1997).

Buffy Season 2

These tales take place during Buffy Season 2, (from autumn 1997 up until spring 1998).

Buffy Season 3

These tales take place during Buffy Season 3 (from autumn 1998 up until spring 1999).

Buffy Season 4/Angel Season 1

These Buffyverse tales take place during Buffy Season 4, and Angel Season 1 (from autumn 1999 up until spring 2000).

Buffy Season 5/Angel Season 2

These Buffyverse tales take place during Buffy Season 5, and Angel Season 2 (from autumn 2000 up until spring 2001).

Buffy Season 6/Angel Season 3

These Buffyverse tales take place around Buffy Season 6, and Angel Season 3 (from autumn 2001 up until spring 2002).

Buffy Season 7–8/Angel Season 4–5

These Buffyverse tales take place around Buffy Season 7, and Angel Season 4 (from autumn 2002 up until spring 2003).

One Thing Or Your Mother (by Kirsten Beyer) - August 2007

Authors
 (w/) = Collaboration with another Buffyverse author
 (s) = Short story

List of authors (alphabetically by surname) who have written novels set in the fictional Buffyverse:

Pierce Askegren – After Image
Laura J. Burns – Colony (w/), Apocalypse Memories (w/)
Denise Ciencin – Nemesis (w/), Mortal Fear (w/)
Scott Ciencin – Sweet Sixteen, Vengeance (w/), Nemesis (w/), Mortal Fear (w/)
Arthur Byron Cover – Night of the Living Rerun
Don DeBrandt – Shakedown
Keith R.A. DeCandido – Blackout
Cameron Dokey – Here Be Monsters, The Summoned, How I Survived My Summer Vacation (s)
Doranna Durgin – Impressions, Fearless, The Longest Night (s)
Diana G. Gallagher – Obsidian Fate, Prime Evil, Doomsday Deck, Spark and Burn, Bad Bargain
Craig Shaw Gardner – Return to Chaos, Dark Mirror
Ray Garton – Resurrecting Ravana
Laura Anne Gilman – Visitors (w/), Deep Water (w/)
Christopher Golden – Halloween Rain (w/), Blooded (w/), Child of the Hunt (w/), The Gatekeeper trilogy (w/), Immortal (w/), Sins of the Father, Pretty Maids All in a Row, The Lost Slayer series, Oz: Into the Wild, Wisdom of War, Monster Island (w/)
Christie Golden – Tales of the Slayer (s), The Longest Night (s)
Alice Henderson – Night Terrors, Portal Through Time
Nancy Holder – Halloween Rain (w/), Blooded (w/), Child of the Hunt (w/), The Gatekeeper trilogy (w/), Immortal (w/), The Evil That Men Do, The Book of Fours, Blood and Fog, Keep Me In Mind, Queen of the Slayers, Carnival of Souls, Not Forgotten, Endangered Species, The Longest Night (s)
Dan Jolley – Vengeance (w/)
Dori Koogler – These Our Actors (w/)
Robert Joseph Levy – The Suicide King, Go Ask Malice, ToS: Back to the Garden (s)
Ashley McConnell – These Our Actors (w/), Book of the Dead
Jeff Mariotte – Unseen Trilogy (w/), Hollywood Noir, Haunted, Stranger to the Sun, Endangered Species, Sanctuary, Solitary Man, Love and Death, Close to the Ground
Elizabeth Massie – Power of Persuasion
Melinda Metz – Colony (w/), Apocalypse Memories (w/)
Rebecca Moesta – Little Things
Yvonne Navarro – Wicked Willow trilogy, Paleo, Tempted Champions, Tales of the Slayer (s), How I Survived My Summer Vacation (s), The Longest Night (s)
Mel Odom – Unnatural Selection, Revenant, Crossings, Cursed, Redemption, Bruja, Image, ToS: Ch'ing Shih (s), ToS: Silent Screams (s)
John Passarella – Ghoul Trouble, Avatar, Monolith
Paul Ruditis – ToS: The Show Must Go On (s)
Josepha Sherman – Visitors (w/), Deep Water (w/)
Thomas E. Sniegoski – Soul Trade (w/), Monster Island (w/)
John Vornholt – Coyote Moon, Seven Crows

Canonical issues
The books featured in this list are not part of Buffyverse canon. They are not considered as official Buffyverse reality, but are novels from the authors' imaginations. However unlike fanfic, 'overviews' summarising their story, written early in the writing process, were 'approved' by both Fox and Whedon (or his office), and were therefore later published as officially Buffy or Angel merchandise (see main article for details).

See also
Buffy/Angel crossover novels

External links
Nika Summer's Buffy Library

Buffyverse
Buffy